Summit Lake State Park is a park located near New Castle, Indiana in east-central Indiana. Summit Lake became Indiana's 19th state park in 1988.

The park is a mix of woodlands, old fields, wetlands, and prairie restoration areas which provide a wide range of flora and fauna. More than 100 species of birds reside in the park, and the area is popular among photographers and bird watchers. Hiking trails offer good views of the lake. Zeigler Woods Nature Preserve, at the southwest corner of the park, is Henry County's only dedicated nature preserve. Summit Lake receives about 235,000 visitors annually.

The park is 1 of 14 Indiana State Parks that are in the path of totality for the 2024 solar eclipse, with the park experiencing 3 minutes and 59 seconds of totality.

Facilities 
 Boats
 Camping (water and electric hook-ups)
 Concessions
 Fishing
 Hiking
 Interpretive Naturalist Service
 Picnic areas
 Shelter house
 Beach swimming (seasonal)

References

External links 
 
 Henry County Convention & Visitors Bureau

Protected areas established in 1988
Protected areas of Henry County, Indiana
State parks of Indiana
1988 establishments in Indiana